The rufous-bellied swallow (Cecropis badia) is a species of swallow that breeds on the Malay Peninsula. It has faintly streaked deep rufous underparts, and an unstreaked rump. It is usually raised to species status from its closest relative, the striated swallow.

References
  

rufous-bellied swallow
Birds of the Malay Peninsula
rufous-bellied swallow